Progress Software Corporation (Progress) is an American public company that offers software for creating and deploying business applications. Headquartered in Burlington, Massachusetts with offices in 16 countries, the company posted revenues of $531.3 million (USD) in 2021 and employs approximately 2100 people.

History 
Progress Software was co-founded by several MIT graduates, including Joseph W. Alsop, Clyde Kessel, and Chip Ziering in 1981. Initially called Data Language Corporation (DLC), the company changed its name to Progress Software in 1987 to match that of its flagship product, Progress. In May 2016, Progress Software re-branded as "Progress" in an effort to "shed any doubts it was not living up to its name".

Products 
The Progress portfolio includes solutions for enterprise integration, data interoperability, and application development, including Software as a Service (SaaS) enablement and delivery.

Current Product Portfolio

Digital Experience 

 Sitefinity - web content management.
 Sitefinity Digital Experience Cloud - customer experience tool for customer journey analysis, personalization, and optimization.
 NativeScript – open source platform for building cross-platform native iOS and Android mobile apps.
 NativeChat – an AI platform for creating and deploying chatbots.
 Corticon - business rules engine.

Infrastructure Management and Operations 

 Kemp LoadMaster
 Flowmon
 WhatsUp Gold

DevOps 

 Chef

UI/UX Tools 
 Kendo UI – UI toolkit for web development.
 Telerik – UI tools for .NET development.
 Test Studio – test automation.
 Fiddler Everywhere

Secure Data Connectivity and Integration 

DataDirect Connectors – connectors to integrate data across relational, big data and cloud databases.
 DataDirect Hybrid Data Pipeline – hybrid connectivity to data in the cloud or on-premises.

Secure File Transfer 

 MOVEit
 WS_FTP

Mission-Critical App Platform 
 OpenEdge – platform for building business applications and database management system.

Mergers and Acquisitions 

In October 2002, Progress Software acquired Boston based eXcelon Corporation (formerly Object Design) for approximately US$24 Million. eXcelon created an XML IDE, Stylus Studio, which is now marketed by Progress Software.
 In December 2003, Progress Software acquired DataDirect Technologies Ltd. for $88 million. 
 In 2004, Progress Software bought out Persistence Software for $16 million.
 In 2005, Progress acquired Apama and entered the Complex event processing Space.
 In January 2006, Progress Software acquired Mountain View-based Actional Corporation, which itself was the merger between Actional Corporation and WestBridge Technologies (an XML Security company). Actional focuses on providing enterprise-class SOA Management, Security, and run-time Governance solutions that cross vendor and protocol boundaries, based upon open standards.
 In March 2006, Progress Software acquired Neon Systems, which offers a set of capabilities for companies seeking to modernize existing 3270 applications. In 2010, Progress Software acquired the Santa Clara-based Savvion Inc., a provider of Business Process Management technology. Later that year, Progress announced the introduction of its Responsive Process Management (RPM) suite, including its Progress Control Tower.
 In June 2008, Progress Software acquired Xcalia, a data integration company, and Mindreef, which developed SOAPscope products. 
 In September 2008, Progress acquired IONA Technologies. IONA brought three product lines into the fold: FUSE (open source SOA), Artix (commercially licensed SOA), and Orbix (CORBA infrastructure).
 In April 2011, Progress Software sold their SWIFT integration product "ADS" (formally Iona's "Artix Data Services") to C24 Technologies Ltd (UK). The product was re-branded to its former name "Integration Objects".
 In 2012, Progress announced strategy shift to become a much more narrowly focused, specialist vendor, looking to sell or decommission most of their existing products.
 In June 2012, the company sold its subsidiary FuseSource, which was spun out from Progress in October 2010, to Red Hat. In October 2012, Progress Software sold the brands Sonic, Savvion, Actional and DataXtend (DXSI) to Trilogy which created the company Aurea Software. The company also announced that Jay Bhatt planned to step down from the positions and as a director, effective December 7.
 In June 2013, Progress Software acquired Rollbase Inc. and Software AG acquired Apama activities from Progress Software.
 In June 2014, Progress Software announced that it had acquired Cincinnati-based Modulus.
 In December 2014, Progress Software completed the acquisition of Telerik, a provider of application development tools.
 On May 1, 2019, Progress Software completed the acquisition of Ipswitch, Inc., an IT management software developer for small and medium-sized businesses, known for its MFT Software MOVEit Automation and MOVEit Transfer.
 On September 8, 2020, Progress Software announced the acquisition of Chef Software Inc., the developers of the Progress Chef configuration management tool. The acquisition was completed by October 2020.
 On September 23, 2021, Progress Software announced the acquisition of Kemp Technologies, who build load balancing products. The acquisition was completed on 1 November 2021.
 On January 03, 2023, Progress Software announced the acquisition of MarkLogic Corporation, that develops and provides an enterprise NoSQL database, also named MarkLogic.

References

 
Software companies based in Massachusetts
Companies listed on the Nasdaq
Software companies of the United States